John Hunt may refer to:

Politics
John Hunt (MP for Reading) (fl. 1383–1421), MP for Reading
John Hunt (MP for Barnstaple), in 1407, MP for Barnstaple
John Hunt (died 1586), MP for Rutland
John Samuel Hunt (1785–1865), silversmith
John Hunt (New South Wales politician) (1856–1930), Australian politician
John T. Hunt (1860–1916), U.S. Representative from Missouri
John E. Hunt (1908–1989), New Jersey politician
John Hunt (Western Australian politician) (1912–1988), Australian politician
John Hunt, Baron Hunt of Tanworth (1919–2008), British politician and Secretary of the Cabinet
John S. Hunt II (1928–2001), member of the Louisiana Public Service Commission from 1964 to 1972
John Hunt (British politician, born 1929) (1929–2017), British Conservative Party politician, MP for Bromley, and for Ravensbourne 
John B. Hunt (born 1956), American politician in New Hampshire

Religion
John Hunt (Quaker exile) (1712–1778), Quaker minister, originally from London, England, and one of the "Virginia Exiles"
John Hunt (Quaker minister) (1740–1824), Quaker minister and journalist from Moorestown, New Jersey
John Hunt (missionary) (1812–1838), Methodist missionary
John Hunt (theologian) (1827–1907), Scottish cleric, theologian and historian

Military
John Hunt (1750–1822), Revolutionary War veteran for whom the city of Huntsville, Alabama is named
John Hunt Morgan (1825–1864), general of a Confederate cavalry troop in the American Civil War
Joshua French (alias John Hunt, born 1982), former Norwegian soldier

Sports
John Hunt (cricketer) (1874–1916), English cricketer
John Hunt (curler), Welsh curler
John Hunt (American football) (born 1962), American football guard
John Hunt (rower) (born 1935), Australian Olympic rower

Others
John Hunt (gentleman) (c. 1550–1615), English gentleman of Rutland
John Hunt (sculptor) (c.1690-1754) English sculptor
John Hunt (Michigan judge) (died 1827), American jurist
John Hunt (publisher) (1775–1848), English printer and publisher
John Horbury Hunt (1838–1904), Canadian-born Australian architect
John Hunt (antiquarian) (1900–1976), Irish antiquarian and collector
John Hunt, Baron Hunt (1910–1998), leader of the 1953 British expedition to climb Mount Everest
John Hunt (oceanographer) (1918–2005), marine scientist at the Woods Hole Oceanographic Institution
John Hunt (psychiatric patient) (born 1981), Irish citizen who was involuntarily detained
John Dixon Hunt (born 1936), European-born landscape historian
John Wesley Hunt (1773–1849), businessman and early civic leader in Lexington, Kentucky
John Hunt, Baron Hunt of Fawley (1905–1987), British general practitioner
Johnny Hunt (born 1952), Christian pastor and author
John Hunt, a fictional character in Willard Price's Adventure series
Jackie Hunt (1920–1991), American football player with Chicago Bears

See also
John le Hunt, English-born judge in Ireland
Jon Hunt (born 1953), British estate agent
John Hunt Publishing, established 2001
Jonathan Hunt (disambiguation)
Jack Hunt (disambiguation)